In enzymology, a diphthine synthase is an enzyme that catalyzes the chemical reaction

S-adenosyl-L-methionine + 2-(3-carboxy-3-aminopropyl)-L-histidine  S-adenosyl-L-homocysteine + 2-[3-carboxy-3-(methylammonio)propyl]-L-histidine

Thus, the two substrates of this enzyme are S-adenosyl methionine and 2-(3-carboxy-3-aminopropyl)-L-histidine, whereas its two products are S-adenosylhomocysteine and [[2-[3-carboxy-3-(methylammonio)propyl]-L-histidine]].

This enzyme belongs to the family of transferases, specifically those transferring one-carbon group methyltransferases.  The systematic name of this enzyme class is S-adenosyl-L-methionine:2-(3-carboxy-3-aminopropyl)-L-histidine methyltransferase. Other names in common use include S-adenosyl-L-methionine:elongation factor 2 methyltransferase, and diphthine methyltransferase.

Structural studies

References

 
 

EC 2.1.1
Enzymes of known structure